Achondrostoma is a genus of freshwater fish in the family Cyprinidae, the carps and minnows. It is endemic to the Iberian Peninsula.

The genus was erected in 2007 for three fish separated from genus Chondrostoma on the basis of genetic evidence. Later that year a population of Iberochondrostoma lemmingii was separated on the basis of morphological and phylogenetic data and described as the fourth species of Achondrostoma.

Species
Species include:
 Achondrostoma arcasii (Steindachner, 1866)
 Achondrostoma occidentale (Robalo, et al., 2005)
 Achondrostoma oligolepis (Robalo, et al., 2005)
 Achondrostoma salmantinum Doadrio & Elvira, 2007

References 

 
Endemic fish of the Iberian Peninsula